Morinda trimera, known as noni kuahiwi is a species of flowering tree in the coffee family, Rubiaceae, that is endemic to Hawaii.

References

Trees of Hawaii
Endemic flora of Hawaii
trimera
Near threatened plants
Taxonomy articles created by Polbot